The 1973 Japan Series was the 24th edition of Nippon Professional Baseball's postseason championship series. It matched the Central League champion Yomiuri Giants against the Pacific League champion Nankai Hawks. The Giants defeated the Hawks in five games to win an NPB-record ninth consecutive Japan Series title.

Summary

See also
1973 World Series

References

Japan Series
Nankai Hawks
Yomiuri Giants
Japan Series
Japan Series
Japan Series
Japan Series